"My Guns Are Loaded" is a song recorded by Welsh singer Bonnie Tyler for her third studio album, Diamond Cut (1979). It was written by Ronnie Scott and Steve Wolfe, who also produced the song with Robin Geoffrey Cable.

The song was a major hit in Canada and France, and a minor hit in the US.

Track listing and formats
 US & France 7" single
 "My Guns Are Loaded" — 3:45
 "Baby I Just Love You" — 3:03
 Germany 7" single
 "My Guns Are Loaded" — 3:45
 "The Eyes of a Fool" — 3:19

Chart performance

References

1979 songs
Bonnie Tyler songs
Songs written by Ronnie Scott (songwriter)
Songs written by Steve Wolfe